In electrical engineering utilization categories are defined by IEC standards and indicate the type of electrical load and duty cycle of the loads to ease selection of contactors and relays.

Definition
The utilization categories category for low-voltage switchgear defines the characteristic operating conditions for switchgear such as contactors, circuit-breakers, circuit-breaker-fuse units, contactor relays, etc. These devices are dimensioned for different electrical loads and for different operating conditions.

The characteristic of the load to be switched or controlled determines the requirements for the switchgear and its correct selection for the intended application. In particular, the stress on the switching path caused by current and voltage during switching on and off is of enormous importance. For example, the switch-on and switch-off current at resistance load corresponds to the continuous operating current, while, for example, squirrel cage motors consumes multiple of the rated operating current during switch-on and in the acceleration phase.

Utilization categories in IEC standard

Contact load in amperes for heaters (AC1) and motors (AC3) can be found directly on the contactor.
The "Utilization category" are mainly categorized in IEC 60947 in the following volume:

 Volume 1: General requirements
 Volume 2: Circuit-breakers
 Volume 3: Circuit-breakers, circuit-breakers, switch-disconnectors and switch-fuse units
 Volume 4-1: Contactors and motor starters; electromechanical contactors and motor starters[1]
 Volume 4-2: Contactors and motor starters - Semiconductor motor controllers and starters for a.c. voltage
 Volume 5-1: Control apparatus and switching elements - Electromechanical control apparatus[1]
 Volume 6-1: Multi-function switchgear and controlgear - Mains switches (categories AC-32A/B)
 Volume 6-2: Multi-function switchgear and controlgear - Control and protective switchgear (CPS)
 Volume 7-1: Auxiliary equipment; Terminal blocks for copper conductors
 Volume 7-2: Ancillary equipment; protective conductor terminal blocks for copper conductors
In addition, IEC/EN 61095 also defines categories for "household and similar applications".

Table
The following table provides an overview of the various abbreviations. Within a utilization category, the suitable size may be selected for the respective type. This depends on the rated current, the rated voltage and the electrical load to be switched.

See also 
 NEMA contact ratings

References 

IEC standards